Maximiliano Armando Quinteros (born 28 April 1989 in Argentina) is an Argentine-born Chilean footballer who currently plays for Deportes Copiapó.

Career

Quinteros started his career with Argentine top flight side Racing Club de Avellaneda, but failed to make an appearance for them due to injury so was sent on loan to Deportivo Merlo, Argentino de Merlo, and Club Atlético San Miguel in the lower leagues. After a few unsuccessful trials, he signed for Argentine fifth division outfit Club Social, Deportivo y Cultural Alsina, with the aim of reaching the fourth division.

For 2015, Quinteros returned to Jorge Newbery de Comodoro Rivadavia in the Argentine fourth division, helping them avoid relegation.

For 2019, he signed for Chilean second division team Deportes Copiapó after failing to establish himself as a starter for Club Atlético Los Andes in the Argentine second division.

For 2020, Quinteros signed for Chilean top flight club C.D. Universidad de Concepción.
For 2021, Quinteros signed for Chilean top flight club Club Deportivo Ñublense

References

External links
 

Living people
1989 births
Argentine footballers
Argentine expatriate footballers
Naturalized citizens of Chile
Association football forwards
Deportes Copiapó footballers
Universidad de Concepción footballers
Club Atlético Los Andes footballers
Sacachispas Fútbol Club players
Club Atlético San Miguel footballers
Argentino de Merlo footballers
Deportivo Merlo footballers
Sportspeople from Avellaneda